Porga is a town located in the Atakora Department of Benin.

The Porga Airport serves Porga.

History 
On December 1-2, 2021, a group of militants, possibly from Burkina Faso, attacked a border security post in Porga, killing two soldiers. This was the second such attack in the country that week (The first occurred in Alibori).

References 

Populated places in Benin
Populated places in the Atakora Department